Edward W. Stack (born 1954/1955) is an American billionaire businessman. In 1984, Stack took over as chairman and chief executive officer (CEO) of Dick's Sporting Goods, a sports equipment retailing company founded in 1948 by his father, Dick Stack. In February 2021, he was succeeded as CEO by Lauren Hobart.

Early life and education 
Edward W. Stack is the son of Richard "Dick" Stack, who founded sports equipment retailer Dick's Sporting Goods in 1948. He grew up in the East Side neighborhood of Binghamton, New York, attended public schools, and played baseball and football at Binghamton North High School. Stack received a Bachelor of Arts and Science degree in accounting from St. John Fisher College in 1977. He planned to become a lawyer, but opted to help run the family business after his father's health declined.

Career 
Stack and his siblings purchased Dick's from their father in the early 1980s, when the company had two locations in Upstate New York. He became chairman and chief executive officer following his father's retirement in 1984. Stack established a board of directors, opened additional stores, and relocated the company's headquarters to Pittsburgh in 1994. He led the company during its initial public offering in 2002.

Stack owned approximately 25 percent of the company's common stock, and controlled nearly two-thirds of its voting shares, as of 2010. After selling 5.8 percent of his holdings in 2013, he owned around 20 percent of the company, primarily via Class B shares. Following the Stoneman Douglas High School shooting in February 2018, Stack announced that Dick's and its subsidiaries would stop selling military pattern semi-automatic rifles and high-capacity magazines, and would not sell firearms to people under the age of 21. In addition, Stack reported to destroy $5 million worth of assault-style-type rifles then in Dick's inventory. He has advocated for stronger gun control and worked to enact change by hiring lobbyists and meeting with politicians.

In February 2021, he was succeeded as CEO by Lauren Hobart.

Board service 
Stack has served on the boards of the Greater Pittsburgh Chamber of Commerce, KeyCorp, the National Retail Federation, and Seton Hall University, as well as the advisory board of Wharton School of the University of Pennsylvania's Jay H. Baker Retailing Initiative.

Recognition 
In 1997, Stack ranked fourth in the "consumer-retailing/hardlines" category of magazine Institutional Investor survey of the best chief American executives, and was named "Sports Executive Visionary of the Year" by magazine SportStyle. He was named "Entrepreneur of the Year in Southwestern Pennsylvania" by Ernst & Young in 1999. In 2005, Stack received a History Makers Award in the "business and industry" category from the Heinz History Center. He was inducted into the National Sporting Goods Association's Sporting Goods Industry Hall of Fame in 2006. Stack received a Humanity and Service Award from the Bus Stops Here Foundation in 2014, and a Major John H. Russell Leadership Award from Marine Corps University's foundation in 2015. He was given an honorary degree of doctor of humane letters from his alma mater, after delivering a commencement speech in 2016.

Personal life 
Stack is married to Donna A. Stack. He is happily married, and lives in Sewickley, Pennsylvania with Donna.

References 

1950s births
Living people
20th-century American businesspeople
21st-century American businesspeople
American billionaires
American retail chief executives
People from Binghamton, New York
People from Sewickley, Pennsylvania
St. John Fisher College alumni